The Swimming Union of the Americas is the swimming continental association for the Americas (i.e. it oversees international aquatics competition within North and South America). It is commonly referred to as ASUA in English, or by its Spanish and French acronym, UANA – Unión Americana de Natación (Spanish) or Union américaine de natation (French).

ASUA was founded during the 1948 Olympics in London, UK.

Organization
ASUA is divided into 4 Zones, each with its own body which organizes competitions. The bodies that oversees these Zones, are:
Zone 1: CONSANAT—the South American Swimming Confederation (Confederación Sudamericana de Natación).
Zone 2: CCCAN—the Central American and Caribbean Swimming Confederation (Confederación Centroamericana y del Caribe de Natación).
Zone 3: United States Aquatic Sports (USAS)
Zone 4: Aquatic Federation of Canada

Member countries (with FINA abbreviations), by zone:

Note:  (BZE) is also a member of ASUA; however, as of June 2016 it is not (yet) listed as a CCCAN member, the regional confederation they geographically belong to.

Competitions
Artistic Swimming: Pan American Artistic Swimming Championships
Swimming: UANA Swimming Cup
Water Polo: UANA Water Polo Cup

See also 
FINA

References

External links
UANA
CONSANAT

Swimming organizations
 
 
Swimming in the Americas
Pan-American sports governing bodies
Sports organizations established in 1948